Cysticamaridae is an extinct family of graptolites.

Genera
List of genera from Maletz (2014):

†Bithecocamara Kozłowski, 1949
†Cysticamara Kozłowski, 1949
†Erecticamara Mierzejewski, 2000
†Flexicollicamara Kozłowski, 1949
†Graptocamara Kozłowski, 1949
†Syringataenia Obut, 1953
†Tubicamara Kozłowski, 1949

References

Graptolites
Prehistoric hemichordate families